This is a list of prominent people from Réunion.

Artists
Serge Huo-Chao-Si, artist, designer, engineer

Musicians
Ann O'aro
Baster
Gérald De Palmas
Olivier Ker Ourio
Ravan
Kamal Krishna Baral
Sabiah
Tonton David
Ziskakan, musical group

Poets
Évariste de Forges de Parny
Léon Dierx
Boris Gamaleya
Charles Marie René Leconte de Lisle

Politicians
Huguette Bello, politician
Ibrahim Dindar, politician
Jean-Claude Fruteau, politician
Margie Sudre, politician
Paul Vergès, regional president
Roland Robert, politician

Writers
Michel Houellebecq, novelist
Charles Marie René Leconte de Lisle
Yves Manglou
Jean-Régis Ramsamy
Ambroise Vollard
Julie Bernard

Other notable people
Keiiti Aki, professor, seismologist, author and mentor
Edmond Albius, horticulturalist
Gilbert Aubry, Bishop of St-Denis
Joseph Bédier, academic and member of the Académie française (born in Paris to Réunionnais parents, raised on the island)
Jeremy Flores, professional surfer
Roland Garros, war hero
 Yoël Armougom
Georges Guibert, Bishop of St-Denis
Pauline Hoarau, model
Dimitri Payet, footballer 
Jacques Payet, world-renowned aikido master
Manu Payet, comedian and radio host
Florent Sinama Pongolle, footballer
Laurent Robert, footballer
 Ludovic Ajorque
Bao Vang (Yves Claude Vinh-San), son of Emperor Duy Tân]]
 Georginio Rutter, footballer

 
Reunionnaise